Shiqihe station, is a station of Line S3 of the Nanjing Metro. It started operations on 6 December 2017.

Shiqihe has been called the system's "most desolate" station: , it was located two kilometers from the nearest settled area and was not connected to any paved roads. Only a few dozen people use the station daily.

References

Railway stations in Jiangsu
Railway stations in China opened in 2017
Nanjing Metro stations